The ABIT BP6  was an ATX motherboard released by ABIT in 1999. It was the first motherboard to allow the use of two unmodified Intel Celeron processors in dual Symmetric multiprocessing (SMP) configuration. This combined with its overclocking capabilities made it a popular option among computer enthusiasts. The BP6 has been credited as the product that made multi-processor systems affordable for mainstream users, as prior the expense of any multi-processor configuration made it a feature only to be considered for workstation-class systems.

The BP6 was based on the Intel Seattle 440BX chipset, consisting of the 82443BX Northbridge and the 82371AB Southbridge.

Processors that were supported by the BP6 in SMP configuration were the PPGA Socket 370 Celeron processors (300–533 MHz). Later Pentium III and Celeron Coppermine models could also operate on the BP6, albeit only in single processor configuration with the use of aftermarket socket adaptors. Intel never intended the Celeron to be able to operate in SMP, and later-generation Celeron processors had their SMP interface disabled, restricting the feature to the higher-end Pentium III and Xeon product lines.

The motherboard also featured two extra HDD ports, one with the HPT366 Ultra DMA/66 adapter fitted on the mainboard itself. This allowed up to eight IDE compatible drives to operate at the interface's maximum speed.

The motherboard featured ABIT SoftMenu BIOS extension which allowed for jumper-less adjustment of system parameters such as system bus speed, CPU & AGP bridge multipliers, voltages from inside the BIOS and PC-99 coloring.

The BP6, and many other of ABIT's motherboards produced between 1999 and 2005, were victims of the capacitor plague.

References

External links

 

Computer-related introductions in 1999
Motherboard
Parallel computing